The Roman Catholic Archdiocese of Maribor is an archdiocese located in the city of Maribor in Slovenia.

History
 1859 : Maribor (then Marburg) became the see of the Diocese of Lavant
 March 5, 1962: Established as Diocese of Maribor from the Diocese of Lavant
 April 7, 2006: Promoted as Metropolitan Archdiocese of Maribor 

It was reported in January 2012 that the Archdiocese of Maribor was in deep financial difficulties and just before bankruptcy. The whole amount of debts, provoked by high-risk investments was 800 million euros. The Archbishop of Maribor, Marjan Turnšek, and the Archbishop of Ljubljana, Anton Stres, have resigned due to their involvement after the request by Pope Francis.

United titles
 Lavant (since March 5, 1962)

Special churches
Former Cathedral:  
 Stolna cerkev sv. Jurija, Ptuj
Minor Basilica:  
 Bazilika Marije, matere usmiljenja, Maribor
 Bazilika Marije Zavetnice s plaščem, Ptujska Gora

Leadership
 Bishops of Maribor (Latin Rite) 
 Maksimilijan Držečnik (5 March 1962 – 13 May 1978)
 Franc Kramberger (6 November 1980 – 7 April 2006); see below
 Archbishops of Maribor (Latin Rite)
 Franc Kramberger (7 April 2006 – 3 February 2011); see above
 Marjan Turnšek (3 February 2011 - 31 July 2013)
 Stanislav Lipovšek, Bishop of Celje, Apostolic Administrator (31 July 2013 – 26 April 2015)
 Alojzij Cvikl, S.J. (14 March 2015 - present)
 Coadjutor archbishop Anton Stres (31 January 2009 – 28 November 2009), did not succeed to see; appointed Archbishop of Ljubljana
 Coadjutor archbishop Marjan Turnšek (28 November 2009 – 3 February 2011)

Suffragan dioceses
 Celje 
 Murska Sobota

See also
Roman Catholicism in Slovenia

References

External links

 Official site
 GCatholic.org
 Catholic Hierarchy

Roman Catholic dioceses in Slovenia
Christian organizations established in 1962
Roman
Roman Catholic dioceses and prelatures established in the 20th century